John Gregory Canfield (born July 12, 1960) is an American politician from the state of Alabama. He currently serves as the Secretary of Commerce for the State of Alabama.

Canfield was elected the Alabama House of Representatives in the 2006 elections. He was re-elected in 2010. Governor Robert J. Bentley appointed Canfield to the Alabama Development Office in July 2011, succeeding Seth Hammett.

References

Living people
Republican Party members of the Alabama House of Representatives
1960 births